Derek Carpenter (born 26 July 1988) is a New Zealand born rugby union footballer who plays as either a Second Five-Eighth or Centre. He represented Japan at the international level, starting at inside centre against Romania and Ireland in the 2017 July Tests.

He formally played for Toyota Verblitz having joined them in 2014. He was named in the first ever  squad which competed in the Super Rugby 2016 season.

References

1988 births
Living people
New Zealand rugby union players
New Zealand expatriate rugby union players
New Zealand expatriate sportspeople in Japan
Expatriate rugby union players in Japan
Rugby union fly-halves
Rugby union centres
Northland rugby union players
Toyota Verblitz players
Sunwolves players
Tokyo Sungoliath players
People educated at Kamo High School
Rugby union players from Whangārei